Fausto del Rosario Mercedes (born 14 January 1971) is a Dominican Republic boxer. He competed in the men's light flyweight event at the 1992 Summer Olympics. At the 1992 Summer Olympics, he lost to Eric Griffin of the United States.

References

External links
 

1971 births
Living people
Dominican Republic male boxers
Olympic boxers of the Dominican Republic
Boxers at the 1992 Summer Olympics
Place of birth missing (living people)
Light-flyweight boxers